The Land Rover Range Rover Evoque (generally known simply as the Range Rover Evoque) is a compact luxury crossover SUV developed and produced by Jaguar Land Rover under their Land Rover marque. The original Evoque was a development of the Land Rover LRX concept vehicle, which was unveiled at the North American International Auto Show in January 2008. The first generation Evoque was produced from July 2011 until 2018 in three and five-door versions, with both two-wheel and four-wheel drive. The second generation of the car went into production in 2018.



First generation (L538; 2011)

Development 

The size of the LRX concept vehicle complemented a wide array of efficiency-improving technologies in the form of Land Rover's e_Terrain technologies. These included biofuel compatibility, lightweight construction materials, and technologies such as the removable carbon composite roof panels, regenerative brakes, a stop-start system, and the ERAD (electric rear axle drive) parallel hybrid powertrain system.

The ERAD system could propel the LRX to speeds up to  before the engine was started by an integrated starter generator as part of the stop-start system. ERAD was designed to reduce  emissions by an average of 20% under the NEDC test cycle and was expected to offer another 10%  reduction in extra-urban driving situations while also optimising the off-road ability of the vehicle. The engine would become the only four-cylinder vehicle in the Range Rover lineup.

The Terrain Response system was also included offering sport and eco modes in addition to the existing grass, gravel, snow, and sand modes. Typical Land Rover design traits aim at improving off-road performance included a prominent driving position, hill descent control, and useful approach and departure angles. A Land Rover first was an air intake system integrated into the roof that offered exceptional wading capabilities, though this feature did not make it to the production model. Land Rover's Range Rover styling was visually apparent in the form of the clamshell bonnet, the 'floating' roof, dual-pocket headlamps, and raked roof line.

Interior design improvements were another main focus of the LRX concept, though the interior of the production Evoque changed significantly from the concept LRX. Notable interior features in the LRX included ambient interior lighting that changed according to Terrain Response settings, and vehicle data that were presented to the driver through a 'floating' three-dimensional LCD. An aluminium centre console with an iPhone docking station stretched the length of the cabin, separating the four seats and the tailgate. Seats with open frameworks were used to give the impression of an airy interior, while also creating useful under-seat and under-floor stowage areas. Electric motors folded the rear seats forward, providing enough room for two mountain bikes to be fitted upright, with front wheels removed and stored in dedicated slots in the floor.

Market entry

The car was launched as two distinct models (later three models for 2017): the five-door Evoque, the three-door Evoque Coupé, and the Convertible Evoque (launched as a 2017 model). The Coupé model was later discontinued after the 2017 model year, while the five-door and Convertible models remained in production until the 2018 model year.

The production-model Evoque retained nearly identical bodywork from the LRX concept vehicle, including the cabin-length panoramic sun roof. No hybrid power train is currently being offered.

There were originally three trim levels available with each trim level having two variants as follows: — "Pure", "Pure Tech", "Prestige", "Prestige Lux", "Dynamic" and "Dynamic Lux". Land Rover markets the Pure as the minimalist version rather than the "base model", while the Prestige adds luxury options and the Dynamic focuses more on performance.

Body 

The Evoque comes in 12 different body colours with three optional contrasting roof colours and five optional wheel choices, though Land Rover offers a "designers choice" of predetermined combinations on most models. The Dynamic model incorporates more aggressive bodywork including a different front fascia and lowered suspension.

The Evoque can be equipped with five exterior cameras.

Engines 
   
Land Rover revealed the Evoque with a 9-speed automatic transmission during the Geneva Motor Show. This new automatic transmission is developed by ZF Friedrichshafen. In addition, the 9-speed automatic transmission's first gear is specially designed for off-road conditions, towing, and adverse on-road conditions. Further, the first gear of a 9-speed automatic transmission is much lower than the first gear of a six-speed automatic. Land Rover did not reveal any further technical details about the new automatic transmission.

Land Rover since have developed their own branded Ingenium engine to adhere to EU6 emissions regulations. Three 2-litre variants are available: eD4  turbodiesel two-wheel drive manual gearbox, or TD4  permanent four-wheel drive 9-speed automatic, and a 2-litre Si4  turbocharged petrol permanent four-wheel drive 9-speed automatic.

The manufacturer's fuel-economy estimates for the 2.2-litre diesel engine with manual transmission are  urban and  combined, with  emissions of 133 g/km.

For the 2.0-litre petrol engine with automatic transmission, the figures are  urban and  combined, with 199 g/km .

Off-road performance 
The Evoque has  of ground clearance, 25° approach and 33° departure angles, and a  wading depth.

The Evoque was equipped with either two-wheel drive or a generation IV Haldex permanent four-wheel drive system until the 2014 model year update when the Haldex system was replaced by two optional All-Wheel Drive Systems (Standard Driveline or Active Driveline) by GKN Driveline. The Evoque also comes standard with Land Rover's latest version of Terrain Response, which maximises traction in a variety of conditions by altering throttle response, power distribution, and suspension settings. The Terrain Response system also includes electronic stability control, roll stability control, traction control, and an optional hill-descent control that automatically applies braking to control speed when moving down an incline.

A third-generation MagneRide suspension system is also available, which works by magnetising iron particles inside the suspension fluid to quickly adapt shock absorber firmness to road changes.

Interior 

Standard equipment includes accent lighting located throughout the interior, push button start and a 5–inch driver's information display.

Options include a panoramic fixed sunroof; heated seating, steering wheel, and windscreen wipers; and an 8–inch touch screen entertainment system that can display separate images to both the driver and front passenger.

There are 12 interior colour choices, various wood and metal trims and three optional contrasting roof treatments.

Safety 
The European New Car Assessment Programme (Euro NCAP) awarded the Evoque a five–star car safety rating, earning the following ratings for each criterion. The tested model was a right-hand drive, five-door with a 2.2 diesel engine registered in 2011:

The Australasian New Car Assessment Program (ANCAP) rated the Evoque four out of five stars for crash safety, scoring 32.49 out of 37. This score takes into account the 12.39 out of 16 rating in the frontal offset crash test, and the score of 16 out of 16 received for the side impact test.

Update, editions and variant

2014 model year update (2013–2018)

Changes include: ZF-9HP automatic gearbox, new driver assistance and convenience features (Park Exit (to automatically exit parallel parking bays), Perpendicular Park (to position the car centrally in parking bays), Closing Vehicle Sensing and Reverse Traffic Detection (to warn drivers of oncoming traffic), Lane Departure Warning, Traffic Sign Recognition and Wade Sensing), optional Land Rover InControl connected car system, new colour options for the interior, four new alloy wheel styles, a new style of Land Rover badge on the grille, wheel centres and tailgate.

A completely new optional feature is the new Land Rover Active Driveline on demand four-wheel drive system, which is manufactured by GKN Driveline. The Active Driveline system works by disconnecting all of the major all wheel drive components from the gearbox, rather than at the central coupling. The system also features torque vectoring to direct power to individual wheels. GKN Driveline also supplies the all-wheel drive system for the Standard Driveline thus replacing the Haldex system.

Early models include a choice of three engines (2.2 diesel 150PS engine, 2.2 diesel 190PS engine or 2.0 Petrol 240PS engine). Active Driveline became initially available on Si4 petrol engine.

UK models went on sale in Q4 2013.

Range Rover Evoque Autobiography Dynamic (2013–2018)
Available in coupé or 5-door body styles, it is a version of the Range Rover Evoque with a 285PS/400Nm 2.0-litre petrol engine, revised chassis for sharper handling, 350mm front brake discs, Land Rover InControl Apps, forged 20-inch alloy wheels in satin technical grey, exterior trim components detailed in Santorini black, new design of grille, lower front valance, new foglight surrounds 'Autobiography' illuminated tread plates, ingot badging on the tailgate and front wing vents, darkened headlights, clear tail lamps, Santorini black contrast roof, body-colour side trim visually lowers the vehicle a dynamic plus leather interior with either sports or premium climate seats in a range of four colours, Autobiography embossed logo at front seats, dashboard with dark brushed aluminium trim, Active driveline and torque vectoring by braking.

Range Rover Evoque Pearl Noir Edition (2014–2018)
The Pearl Noir Special Edition is a version of the Range Rover Evoque for the Hong Kong market, with a 2-litre Si4 (240PS) engine, ZF 9-speed automatic transmission, 8-inch touch screen, Meridian audio system, leather interior upholstery, Panoramic roof, 20-inch Style 9 alloy wheels in matte black, Xenon headlamps with black lamp shade, black exhaust tip, black rear diffuser, black interior and gold body colour.

Range Rover Evoque Convertible (2017–2018)

Based on the three-door Evoque Coupé, it has four seats, a power-retractable soft top roof, 20-inch wheels. The Evoque's hatchback has been replaced with a drop-down tailgate. Land Rover has stated that: "The new convertible body has been achieved with minimum changes to weight and torsional rigidity. Land Rover has also stated that the Convertible Concept is as off-road ready as the regular Evoque. The vehicle was unveiled in 2012 at the Geneva Motor Show. After debuting as the 2012 Land Rover Range Rover Evoque Convertible Concept, the production version was revealed in November 2015, while the model years start from 2017.

Land Rover design chief, Gerry McGovern said "It’s the first luxury SUV convertible. There have been other convertible SUVs, but not a luxury execution. We’ll take buyers from other luxury cars. Most Evoque customers came from premium brands, but had never owned an SUV before".

Production
On 11 March 2009, the British government announced a £27 million grant to Land Rover to produce an all-new model, subject to the conditions that the Evoque would be manufactured at the Jaguar Land Rover Halewood assembly facility in Liverpool.

Production of the Evoque started on 4 July 2011, at Land Rover's Halewood manufacturing plant in Liverpool, with the first customer deliveries in September. The Evoque platform, named LR-MS, is loosely based on the Ford EUCD platform (which was used on the company's Freelander 2) but 90% of its parts were redesigned.

The British Motor Industry Heritage Trust was given the first vehicle off the line to add to their collection, held at the Heritage Motor Centre in Gaydon, but Land Rover ambassador Zara Phillips became the first person to take delivery of a new Range Rover Evoque.

Reception 
Prior to going on sale in September 2011, Land Rover had 18,000 pre-orders for the Evoque. By July 2012, a year after production began, the company had sold 80,000 units. Land Rover later revealed that they had sold nearly 90,000 units.

Since its launch the Evoque has received acclaim from the automotive press including several "best of" awards. The popular British car show Top Gear, view the Evoque as the softening of the Land Rover image, though Top Gear were impressed with the Evoque's off-road capabilities.
Motor Trend contends that the Evoque is the necessary evolution of the Land Rover brand to stay competitive in a more environmentally conscious marketplace.

The Evoque has been awarded several national and international awards including:

 2012 North American Truck of the Year
 2012 World Design Car of the Year, part of the World Car of the Year awards
 2012 Women's Overall World Car of The Year and Women's Top World Luxury Car of the Year
 2012 Best of the Best/Truck by AutoWeek magazine
 2012 SUV of the Year by Motor Trend in 2011
 2011 Auto Express Car of the Year
 2011 Car of the Year by Top Gear, "SUV of the Year 2011" and "Jeremy's Car of the Year".
 2010 Best production car by Car Design News in 2010

Criticism has been made of the Evoque's voice interface and the entertainment system's touchscreen.

Chinese copy controversy 
In November 2014, Chinese automotive joint-venture company Landwind officially revealed the Landwind X7 at the Guangzhou Auto Show, which shares major resemblance to the Evoque. JLR complained to authorities in order to try to stop its production. The authorities first did nothing to support Land Rover, but on 22 March 2019, after four years of sales, a Chinese court ruled that Landwind had copied five unique design elements and ordered a cease of production and sales immediately, in addition to paying Jaguar Land Rover compensation.

Second generation (L551; 2018) 

The second generation Evoque was revealed at an event in London on 22 November 2018.

Engines at launch are diesels in 150 bhp FWD and 180 and 240 bhp AWD, and AWD petrols in 200, 250 and 300 bhp. The second-generation Evoque adopts Land Rover's new design language that was launched with the Velar in 2017. This includes retracting door handles, smoother surfacing, and a new infotainment system with a second touchscreen with integrated knobs for climate settings. In some countries, Evoque is also available with 1.5t 3 cylinder non-PHEV engine that was called " P160 ".

The 15 kWh lithium-ion battery pack is claimed to deliver an all-electric range of up to 66 km (41 mi).

A China-exclusive long-wheelbase version was revealed at an event in Shanghai on 15 June 2021.

Worldwide sales 
2011 represented only a partial year of sales as it was released later in the year, amounting to 10% of total Land Rover sales worldwide. For 2012 and 2013, the Evoque achieved nearly 36% of total Land Rover sales.

References

External links

 

Land Rover vehicles
Cars introduced in 2011
2020s cars
Mini sport utility vehicles
Luxury crossover sport utility vehicles
Front-wheel-drive vehicles
All-wheel-drive vehicles
ANCAP small off-road
Euro NCAP small off-road
Hybrid electric cars
Concept cars